Charlotta Fougberg (born 19 June 1985) is a Swedish athlete who specializes in steeplechase. Fougberg was European number one in 3000 Meters steeplechase in 2014 and in that same year, she won a European Championships silver medal.

She set a Swedish 3000m steeplechase record when she won the 2014 IfAM Oordegem in 9:34.61.

Competition record

Personal bests
Outdoor
1500 metres – 4:11.89 (Karlstad 2014)
3000 metres – 8:58.56 (Oslo 2014)
5000 metres – 15:23.80 (Heusden-Zolder 2018)
10,000 metres – 32:34.47 (Tampere 2018)
5 kilometres – 16:01 (Vienna 2015)
10 kilometres – 32:51 (Malmö 2015)
Half marathon – 1:11:58 (Stresa 2018)
3000 metres steeplechase – 9:23.96 (Glasgow 2014)
Indoor
1500 metres – 4:14.19 (Växjö 2017)
3000 metres – 8:55.21 (Belgrade 2017)

References

1985 births
Living people
Swedish female steeplechase runners
Swedish female middle-distance runners
World Athletics Championships athletes for Sweden
European Athletics Championships medalists
Athletes (track and field) at the 2016 Summer Olympics
Olympic athletes of Sweden
People from Lerum Municipality
Swedish Athletics Championships winners
Sportspeople from Västra Götaland County